Lawrence E. "Larry" Townsend (June 10, 1947 – June 29, 2013) was an American politician.

Early life and education 
Born in Bethel, Vermont, Townsend served in the United States Army during the Vietnam War. He received an associate degree from Vermont Technical College.

Career 
Townsend worked for General Electric and the United States Postal Service. Townsend also served in local government in the Randolph Selectboard and Randolph High School board. Townsend served in the Vermont House of Representatives as a Democrat from 2008 until his death in 2013.

Personal life 
Townsend died in Randolph, Vermont, of cancer.

References

1947 births
2013 deaths
People from Bethel, Vermont
People from Randolph, Vermont
Democratic Party members of the Vermont House of Representatives
Military personnel from Vermont
Deaths from cancer in Vermont